Mauricio Claver-Carone (born 1975) is an American lawyer, former Treasury Department and National Security Council official, and lobbyist, who was the president of the Inter-American Development Bank from October 2020 until 26 of September 2022.

Early life and education

Claver-Carone was born in Miami, Florida, to parents of Cuban and Spanish descent. 

He earned his Bachelor of Arts degree from Rollins College, Juris Doctor from The Catholic University of America and Master of Laws in International and Comparative Law from Georgetown University Law Center.

Career

Inter-American Development Bank 
In June 2020, the U.S. Department of the Treasury announced its intention to nominate Claver-Carone for the president of the Inter-American Development Bank (IDB), the principal source of long-term financing for economic, social and institutional development in Latin America and the Caribbean.

His nomination generated a mixed reaction among the Bank’s member countries, as the institution’s presidency was historically reserved for a citizen of one of its borrowing member countries.

He was elected by the IDB’s Board of Directors on September 12, 2020, for a five-year term beginning on October 1, 2020. Thirty of the Bank's 48 governors voted for him (67% of total shareholding), including 23 out of the 28 regional governors. 

On 26 September 2022, Claver-Carone was removed from the presidency with a vote by the governors; after an ethics investigation alleged that he had an affair with a subordinate. The affair, which both Claver-Carone and the subordinate denied, allegedly occurred during their tenure on the National Security Council in the Trump administration.  Claver-Carone accused the investigation of being "arbitrary and ad hoc" and as an effort by the Biden Administration to "smear his reputation."

Despite the controversy, under Claver-Carone's presidency, the IDB successfully optimized its balance sheet to deliver record-breaking financing of $23.4 billion while implementing unprecedented cost savings; built a private sector coalition to achieve record-breaking co-financing and mobilization; had the biggest single-year gains ever in transparency indicators and stakeholder satisfaction surveys; named the most women to positions of decision-making power ever in the history of the Bank; ensured small countries were represented in the most senior ranks for the first time; earned long-lost bipartisan support from U.S. Congressional leaders; and ended the Bank's deals with China over the last decade.

Government positions and IMF role 
From 2017 to 2018, Claver-Carone was Senior Advisor for International Affairs at the U.S. Department of the Treasury, where he was a principal policy advisor to the Secretary of the Treasury and to the Under Secretary for International Affairs on geopolitical, national security and economic issues.

He then served as acting U.S. Executive Director at the International Monetary Fund, representing the United States on the Executive Board. He played an important role in lending arrangements for Argentina, Barbados and Ecuador, and revolving credit lines for Colombia and Mexico. 

In September 2018, Claver-Carone was appointed Special Assistant to U.S. President Donald Trump and Senior Director for Western Hemisphere Affairs at the National Security Council. In 2019, he was promoted to become a Deputy Assistant to the President. In this role, Claver-Carone is credited for creating the U.S. government's maximum-pressure campaign against the Maduro regime in Venezuela and for conceptualizing the "América Crece" economic growth strategy and frameworks. He was also selected by President Trump to represent the United States in inauguration delegations to Brazil, Panama and Uruguay.

Claver-Carone also helped design the Better Utilization of Investments Leading to Development (BUILD) Act of 2018, which created the U.S. International Development Finance Corporation.

He also spearheaded the first White House-led Western Hemisphere Strategic Framework for U.S. inter-agency policy guidance and development since 2004.

Early career 
Claver-Carone began his career as an attorney-advisor for the U.S. Department of the Treasury’s Office of the Comptroller, where he provided counsel on banking laws, capital requirements and securitizations. He was also a Clinical Assistant Professor at The Catholic University of America’s School of Law, an adjunct professor at The George Washington University’s National Law Center and a research fellow at Georgetown University’s Law Center for the Americas.

Cuba policy 
Before joining the U.S. government, Claver-Carone was executive director of Cuba Democracy Advocates, a lobbying organization for human rights, free markets and the rule of law in Cuba.

Other 
Claver-Carone has provided congressional testimony before the Committees on Agriculture, Foreign Affairs, the Judiciary and Natural Resources of the United States House of Representatives. 

He has written for HuffPost, The Wall Street Journal and The New York Times, among other publications. He has also published in academic journals, including the Georgetown Journal of International Law and the Yale Journal of International Affairs.

Poder Magazine recognized him as one of 20 entrepreneurs, executives, leaders and artists under 40 who are shaping the future of the U.S. and the world.

Claver-Carone hosted the bilingual foreign-policy show “From Washington al Mundo” on Sirius-XM Radio. He also co-founded a data-software start-up company.

References

External links
Yale Journal of International Affairs, "A Transformational Year in Cuba Policy"
The New York Times, "Freedom First or Business First"
Huffington Post blog contributor
 

1975 births
Catholic University of America alumni
Columbus School of Law alumni
Columbus School of Law faculty
George Washington University Law School faculty
Georgetown University Law Center alumni
Living people
Presidents of the Inter-American Development Bank
Rollins College alumni
Trump administration personnel
United States National Security Council staffers
Date of birth missing (living people)